Nikolay Kuznetsov (1882 – after 1912) was a Russian fencer. He competed in the individual and team sabre events at the 1912 Summer Olympics.

References

1882 births
Year of death missing
Male fencers from the Russian Empire
Olympic competitors for the Russian Empire
Fencers at the 1912 Summer Olympics